The National Institute of Cinema and Audiovisual Arts (INCAA; also referred to as the Argentine National Film Board) is an agency of the Government of Argentina. It promotes the Argentine film industry by funding qualified Argentine film production companies and supporting new filmmakers. The Institute was established on 14 May 1968 by law nº 17.741. The INCAA also organizes the Mar del Plata International Film Festival, Ventana Sur film market, and has its own film school called ENERC.

Ratings
Through its Advisory Commission of Cinematographic Exhibition (Comisión Asesora de Exhibición Cinematográfica) the INCAA issues ratings for films based on the following system:
ATP: Suitable for all ages, ATP stands for "Apta (para) Todo Público", meaning "suitable (for) all public"
13: Suitable for 13-year-olds and over
16: Suitable for 16-year-olds and over
18: Suitable for 18-year-olds and over

Filmography

1987–1999
 Juan: Como si nada hubiera sucedido (1987)
 El General y la fiebre (1993)
 Fuego gris (1994)
 La Memoria del agua (1994)
 Una sombra ya pronto serás (1994)
 El Censor (1995)
 La Ley de la frontera (1995)
 Patrón (1995)
 La Ausencia (1995)
 No te mueras sin decirme adónde vas (1995)
 Evita (1996)
 Despabílate amor (1996)
 Cazadores de utopías (1996)
 Líneas de teléfonos (1996)
 Pavana para un hombre descalzo (1996)
 Plaza de almas (1997)
 24 horas (algo está por explotar) (1997)
 Cenizas del paraíso (1997)
 Sólo gente (1999)
 Angel, la diva y yo (1999)
 Mundo grúa (1999)
 Nostalgia en la mesa 8 (1999)

2000–2002
 Plata quemada (2000)
 Vagón fumador (2001)
 Historias de Argentina en vivo (2001)
 Lua de Outubro (2001)
 Herencia (2001)
 Bolivia (2001)
 Danza con los sueños (2001)
 La Entrega (2002)
 Lugares comunes (2002)
 Potestad (2002)
 Temporal (2002)
 El Descanso (2002)
 El Bonaerense (2002)
 El Cumple (2002)
 Los Malditos caminos (2002)
 Pyme (sitiados) (2002)

2003
 La Quimera de los héroes (2003)
 Bonifacio: Un misterio llegado de Santa Cruz (2003)
 La Cruz del sur (2003)
 El Regreso (2003)
 Ilusión de movimiento (2003)

2004
 Teo, cazador intergaláctico (2004)
 Buenos Aires 100 kilómetros (2004)
 Los Esclavos felices (la secta) (2004)
 Legado (2004)
 Grissinopoli (2004)
 Vereda tropical (2004)
 Historias breves IV: Avant premier (2004)
 Historias breves IV: Columbus (2004)
 Historias breves IV: El señor de los pájaros (2004)
 Historias breves IV: Epitafio (2004)
 Historias breves IV: Happy cool (2004)
 Historias breves IV: Infierno grande (2004)
 Historias breves IV: Más quel mundo (2004)
 Historias breves IV: Paisanitos rubios (2004)
 Historias breves IV: Paraíso viviente (2004)
 18-J (2004)
 El Favor (2004)
 Historias breves IV: Te llevo en la sangre (2004)
 Memoria del saqueo (2004)
 El Perro (2004)
 Cruz de sal (2004)
 El Abrazo partido (2004)
 Buena vida delivery (2004)

2005
 Amando a Maradona (2005)
 12 Tangos - Adios Buenos Aires (2005)
 Tiempo de valientes (2005)
 Iluminados por el fuego (2005)
 Nadie inquietó más - Narciso Ibáñez Menta (2005)
 Sed, invasión gota a gota (2005)
 Locos de la bandera (2005)
 1420, la aventura de educar (2005)
 El Jardín de las hespérides (2005)
 Río arriba (2005)
 Pescadores: La ciudad de los ojos cerrados (2005)
 ...al fin, el mar (2005)

2006
 Sofacama (2006)
 El Exilio de San Martín - Una historia de ausencia (2006)
 Martín Fierro, el ave solitaria (2006)
 Crónica de una fuga (2006)

Footnotes

External links

Entertainment rating organizations
State-owned film companies
Film production companies of Argentina
Video game content ratings systems
1968 establishments in Argentina